The Battle of Akhaltsikhe occurred on 13 November 1853 during the Crimean War when a Georgian-Russian force of 7,000 defeated a Turkish army of 18,000 men near the Akhaltsikhe fortress in the Caucasus.

At the outbreak of the Crimean War, Ali Pasha immediately launched a Turkish offensive to capture the Akhaltsikhe fortress. As the Ottoman force neared the city of Akhaltsikhe, the Turks were met by a Georgian-Russian detachment commanded by Prince Andronnikov.

Despite the numerical superiority of the Turkish force, Prince Andronnikov divided his cavalry into two columns and attacked. One of the Russian columns attacked the Turks head-on while the second column rode to the side and attacked their enemy in the left flank. After a fierce struggle, the Turks were beaten and retreated to Kars. The Russian force lost 361 men while the Turkish casualties amounted to 3,500 men killed, wounded, and captured. 

The Battle of Akhaltsikhe was the first major Russian success in the Caucasian theater of operations during the Crimean War. After this victory, the Turkish ended their offensive actions in the Trans-Caucasus.

Citations

References

General references

Akhaltsikhe
Conflicts in 1853
1853 in the Ottoman Empire
19th century in Georgia (country)